Dumporijo is a circle/ block under; upper subansiri district, in the state of Arunachal Pradesh.  Pin - 791122

Dumporijo is located 12 km east of the district headquarter, Daporijo. Dumporijo is the 26th constituency of the Arunachal Pradesh Legislative Assembly. current MLA is Rode Bui party: Bharatiya Janata Party.

References

Villages in Upper Subansiri district